The Saint Francis River   is a river of Grenada.

See also
List of rivers of Grenada

References
 GEOnet Names Server
Grenada map

Rivers of Grenada